Hamilton Howard "Albert" Fish (May 19, 1870 – January 16, 1936) was an American serial killer, rapist, child molester, and cannibal who committed at least three child murders from July 1924 to June 1928. He was also known as the Gray Man, the Werewolf of Wysteria, the Brooklyn Vampire, the Moon Maniac, and The Boogey Man. 

Fish was a suspect in at least five murders during his lifetime. He confessed to three murders that police were able to trace to a known homicide, and he confessed to stabbing at least two other people. Fish once boasted that he "had children in every state", and at one time stated his number of victims was about 100. However, it is not known whether he was referring to rapes or cannibalization, nor is it known if the statement was truthful.

Fish was apprehended on December 13, 1934, and put on trial for the kidnapping and murder of Grace Budd. He was convicted and executed by electric chair on January 16, 1936, at the age of 65.

Early life
Albert Fish was born in Washington, D.C., on May 19, 1870, to Randall (1795 – October 16, 1875) and Ellen (née Howell; 1838–) Fish. Fish's father was American, of English ancestry, and his mother was Scots-Irish American. His father was forty-three years older than his mother and aged 75 at the time of his birth. Fish was the youngest child and had three living siblings: Walter, Annie, and Edwin. He wished to be known as "Albert" after a dead sibling and to escape the nickname "Ham & Eggs" that he was given at an orphanage in which he spent much of his childhood.

Fish's family had a history of mental illness. His uncle had mania, one of his brothers was confined in a state mental hospital, and his sister Annie was diagnosed with a "mental affliction". Three other relatives were diagnosed with mental illnesses, and his mother had "aural and/or visual hallucinations".

Fish's father, a fertilizer manufacturer, suffered a fatal heart attack at the Baltimore and Potomac Railroad Station in 1875. Congressional Cemetery records show that he died on October 16 and was buried on October 19, in grave R96/89. Fish's mother then put her son into Saint John's Orphanage in Washington, where he was frequently physically abused. Fish began to enjoy the physical pain that the beatings brought.

By 1880, Fish's mother secured a government job and was able to remove Fish from the orphanage. In 1882, at age 12, he began a relationship with a telegraph boy. The youth introduced Fish to such practices as urolagnia (drinking urine) and coprophagia (eating feces). Fish began visiting public baths where he could watch other boys undress, spending a great portion of his weekends on these visits. Throughout his life, he would write obscene letters to women whose names he acquired from classified advertising and matrimonial agencies.

1890–1918: Early adulthood and criminal history
By 1890, at age 20, Fish moved to New York City. There he engaged in male prostitution and began molesting and raping boys, mostly younger than six years old. In 1898, Fish's mother arranged a marriage for him with Anna Mary Hoffman, who was nine years his junior. They had six children: Albert, Anna, Gertrude, Eugene, John, and Henry Fish. In 1903, Fish was arrested for grand larceny, convicted, and incarcerated in Sing Sing.

Fish later recounted an incident in which a male lover took him to a wax museum, where he was fascinated by a bisection of a human penis and subsequently became obsessed with sexual mutilation. 

Several years later, around 1910, Fish was working in Wilmington, Delaware, when he met a 19-year-old man named Thomas Kedden. He took Kedden to where he was staying and the two began a sadomasochistic relationship; it is unclear whether or not Fish forced Kedden to do these things, but his confession implies that Kedden was intellectually disabled. After ten days, Fish took Kedden to "an old farm house", where he tortured him over a period of two weeks. Fish eventually tied Kedden up and cut off half of his penis. "I shall never forget his scream, or the look he gave me", Fish later recalled. He originally intended to kill Kedden, cut up his body, and take it home, but he feared the hot weather would draw attention to him; instead, Fish poured peroxide over the wound, wrapped it in a Vaseline-covered handkerchief, left a $10 bill, kissed Kedden goodbye, and left. "Took first train I could get back home. Never heard what become of him, or tried to find out," Fish said.

In January 1917, Fish's wife left him for John Straube, a handyman who boarded with the Fish family. Fish then had to raise his children as a single parent. After his arrest, Fish told a newspaper that when his wife left him, she took nearly every possession the family owned. Fish began to have auditory hallucinations; he once wrapped himself in a carpet, saying that he was following the instructions of John the Apostle.

It was about this time that Fish began to indulge in self-harm by embedding needles into his groin and abdomen. After his arrest, X-rays revealed that Fish had at least twenty-nine needles lodged in his pelvic region. He also hit himself repeatedly with a nail-studded paddle, and inserted wool doused with lighter fluid into his anus and set it alight. While Fish was never thought to have physically attacked or abused his children, he did encourage them and their friends to paddle his buttocks with the same nail-studded paddle he used to abuse himself.

1919–1930: Escalation
Around 1919, Fish stabbed an intellectually disabled boy in Georgetown. He chose people who were either mentally disabled or African-American as his victims, later explaining that he assumed these people would not be missed when killed. Fish would later claim to have occasionally paid boys to procure other children for him. Fish tortured, mutilated, and murdered young children with his "implements of Hell": a meat cleaver, a butcher knife, and a small handsaw.

On July 11, 1924, Fish found eight-year-old Beatrice Kiel playing alone on her parents' farm on Staten Island, New York. He offered her money to come and help him look for rhubarb. She was about to leave the farm when her mother chased Fish away. Fish left but returned later to the Kiels' barn, where he tried to sleep but was discovered by Beatrice's father and forced to leave. Three days later, Fish killed Francis McDonnell, also on Staten Island. During 1924, the 54-year-old Fish, suffering from psychosis, felt that God was commanding him to torture and sexually mutilate children.

Shortly before his abduction of Grace Budd, Fish attempted to test his "implements of Hell" on a child he had been molesting named Cyril Quinn. Quinn and his friend were playing box ball on a sidewalk when Fish asked them if they had eaten lunch. When they said that they had not, he invited them into his apartment for sandwiches. While the two boys were wrestling on Fish's bed, they dislodged his mattress; underneath was a knife, a small handsaw, and a meat cleaver. They became frightened and ran out of the apartment.

Bigamy
Despite already being married, Fish married Estella Wilcox on February 6, 1930, in Waterloo, New York; they divorced after only one week. Fish was arrested in May 1930 for "sending an obscene letter to a woman who answered an advertisement for a maid." Following that arrest and another in 1931, he was sent to the Bellevue Hospital for observation.

Murder of Grace Budd

On May 25, 1928, Fish saw a classified advertisement in the Sunday edition of the New York World that read, "Young man, 18, wishes position in country. Edward Budd, 406 West 15th Street." On May 28, Fish, then 58 years old, visited the Budd family in Manhattan under the pretense of hiring Edward; he later confessed that he planned to tie Edward up, mutilate him, and leave him to bleed to death. Fish introduced himself as Frank Howard, a farmer from Farmingdale, New York. He promised to hire Budd and his friend Willie, and said he would send for them in a few days. Fish failed to show up, but he sent a telegram to the Budd family apologizing and set a later date.

When Fish returned, he met Edward's younger sister, 10-year-old Grace Budd. He apparently shifted his amorous intentions toward Grace and quickly made up a story about having to attend his niece's birthday party. He convinced the parents, Delia Flanagan and Albert Budd I, to let Grace accompany him to the party that evening. Fish subsequently took Grace to an abandoned house he had previously picked out to use for the murder of his next victim, "Wisteria Cottage" at 359 Mountain Road, located in the East Irvington neighborhood of Irvington, New York. There, he murdered and ate the girl.

The police arrested 66-year-old superintendent Charles Edward Pope on September 5, 1930, as a suspect in Grace's disappearance, accused by Pope's estranged wife. He spent 108 days in jail between his arrest and trial on December 22, 1930. He was found not guilty.

Letter to the mother of Grace Budd
In November 1934, an anonymous letter was sent to Grace's parents which ultimately led the police to Fish. Mrs. Budd was illiterate and could not read the letter herself, so she had her son read it to her. The unaltered letter (complete with Fish's misspellings and grammatical errors) reads:

Police investigated the letter. The story concerning "Capt. Davis" and the "famine" in Hong Kong could not be verified. The part of the letter concerning the murder of Grace, however, was found to be accurate in its description of the kidnapping and subsequent events, although it was impossible to confirm whether or not Fish had actually eaten parts of Grace's body.

Capture

The letter was delivered in an envelope that had a small hexagonal emblem with the letters "N.Y.P.C.B.A." representing "New York Private Chauffeur's Benevolent Association". A janitor at the company told the police he had taken some of the stationery home but left it at his rooming house at 200 East 52nd Street when he moved out. The landlady of the rooming house said that Fish checked out of that room a few days earlier. She said that Fish's son sent him money and he asked her to hold his next check for him. William F. King, the chief investigator for the case, waited outside the room until Fish returned. He agreed to go to headquarters for questioning, then brandished a razor blade. King disarmed Fish and took him to police headquarters.

Fish made no attempt to deny the murder of Grace Budd, saying that he meant to go to the house to kill her brother Edward. Fish said it "never even entered [his] head" to rape the girl, but he later claimed to his attorney that, while kneeling on Grace's chest and strangling her, he did have two involuntary ejaculations. This information was used at trial to make the claim the kidnapping was sexually motivated, thus avoiding any mention of cannibalism.

Other crimes discovered after Fish's arrest

Francis McDonnell
During the night of July 14, 1924, nine-year-old Francis McDonnell was reported missing after he failed to return home after playing catch with friends in Port Richmond, Staten Island. A search was organized and his body was found—hanging by a tree—in a wooded area near his home. He had been sexually assaulted, and then strangled with his suspenders. According to an autopsy, McDonnell had also suffered extensive lacerations to his legs and abdomen, and his left hamstring had almost entirely been stripped of its flesh. Fish refused to claim responsibility for this, although he later stated that he intended to castrate the boy but fled when he heard someone approaching the area.

McDonnell's friends told the police that he was taken by an elderly man with a grey moustache. A neighbour also told the police he observed the boy with a similar-looking man walking along a grassy path into the nearby woods. Francis' mother, Anna McDonnell, said she saw the same man earlier that day, telling reporters, "He came shuffling down the street mumbling to himself and making queer motions with his hands ... I saw his thick grey hair and his drooping grey moustache. Everything about him seemed faded and grey."

This description resulted in the mysterious stranger becoming known as "The Grey Man". The McDonnell murder remained unsolved until the murder of Grace Budd. When several eyewitnesses, among them the Staten Island farmer Hans Kiel, positively identified Fish as the odd stranger seen around Port Richmond on the day of McDonnell's disappearance, Richmond County District Attorney Thomas J. Walsh announced his intention to seek an indictment against Fish for the boy's murder. At first, Fish denied the charges. It was only in March 1935, after the conclusion of his trial for the Budd murder and his confession to the killing of Billy Gaffney (see below), that he confirmed to investigators that he also raped and murdered McDonnell. When the McDonnell confession was made public, the New York Daily Mirror wrote that the disclosure solidified Fish's reputation as "the most vicious child-slayer in criminal history".

Billy Gaffney
On February 11, 1927, 3-year-old Billy Beaton and his 12-year-old brother were playing in the apartment hallway in Brooklyn with 4-year-old Billy Gaffney. When the 12-year-old left for his apartment, both younger boys disappeared; Beaton was found later on the roof of the apartments. When asked what happened to Gaffney, Beaton said "the bogeyman took him." Gaffney's body was never recovered.

Initially, serial killer Peter Kudzinowski was a suspect in Gaffney's murder. Then, Joseph Meehan, a motorman on a Brooklyn trolley, saw a picture of Fish in a newspaper and identified him as the old man whom he saw February 11, 1927; the old man had been trying to quiet a little boy sitting with him on the trolley. The boy was not wearing a jacket, was crying for his mother, and was dragged by the man on and off the trolley. Beaton's description of the "bogeyman" matched Fish. Police matched the description of the child to Gaffney. 

Detectives of the Manhattan Missing Persons Bureau were able to establish that Fish was employed as a house painter by a Brooklyn real estate company during February 1927, and that on the day of Gaffney's disappearance he was working at a location a few miles from where the boy was abducted. Fish claimed the following in a letter to his attorney:

Gaffney's mother Elizabeth visited Fish in Sing Sing, accompanied by Detective King and two other men. She wanted to ask him about her son's death, but Fish refused to speak to her. Fish began to weep and asked to be left alone. After two hours of asking him questions through his lawyer, James Dempsey, Mrs. Gaffney gave up. She was still unconvinced that Fish was her son's killer.

Trial and execution
Fish's trial for the murder of Grace Budd began on March 11, 1935, in White Plains, New York. Frederick P. Close presided as judge and Westchester County Chief Assistant District Attorney Elbert F. Gallagher was prosecuting attorney. Fish's defense counsel was James Dempsey, a former prosecutor and the one-time mayor of Peekskill, New York. The trial lasted for ten days. Fish pleaded insanity, and claimed to have heard voices from God telling him to kill children. Several psychiatrists testified about Fish's sexual fetishes, which included sadism and masochism, flagellation, exhibitionism, voyeurism, piquerism, cannibalism, coprophagia, urophilia, hematolagnia, pedophilia, necrophilia, and infibulation. Dempsey in his summation noted that Fish was a "psychiatric phenomenon" and that nowhere in legal or medical records was there another individual who possessed so many sexual abnormalities. 

The defense's chief expert witness was Fredric Wertham, a psychiatrist with an emphasis on child development who conducted psychiatric examinations for the New York criminal courts. During two days of testimony, Wertham explained Fish's obsession with religion and specifically his preoccupation with the biblical story of Abraham and Isaac (Genesis 22:1–24). Wertham said that Fish believed that similarly "sacrificing" a boy would be penance for his own sins and that even if the act itself was wrong, angels would prevent it if God did not approve. Fish attempted the sacrifice once before but was thwarted when a car drove past. Edward Budd was the next intended victim, but he turned out to be larger than expected so he settled on Grace. Although he knew Grace was female, it is believed that Fish perceived her as a boy. Wertham then detailed Fish's cannibalism, which in his mind he associated with communion. The last question Dempsey asked Wertham was 15,000 words long, detailed Fish's life and ended with asking how the doctor considered his mental condition based on this life. Wertham simply answered "He is insane." 

Gallagher cross-examined Wertham on whether Fish knew the difference between right and wrong. He responded that he did know but that it was a perverted knowledge based on his opinions of sin, atonement, and religion and thus was an "insane knowledge". The defense called two more psychiatrists to support Wertham's findings.

The first of four rebuttal witnesses was Menas Gregory, the former manager of the Bellevue Hospital, where Fish was treated during 1930. He testified that Fish was abnormal but sane. Under cross-examination, Dempsey asked if coprophilia, urophilia, and pedophilia indicated a sane or insane person. Gregory replied that such a person was not "mentally sick" and that these were common perversions that were "socially perfectly alright" and that Fish was "no different from millions of other people", some very prominent and successful, who had the "very same" perversions. The next witness was the resident physician at The Tombs, Perry Lichtenstein. Dempsey objected to a doctor with no training in psychiatry testifying on the issue of sanity, but Justice Close overruled on the basis that the jury could decide what weight to give a prison doctor. When asked whether Fish's causing himself pain indicated a mental condition, Lichtenstein replied, "That is not masochism", as he was only "punishing himself to get sexual gratification". The next witness, Charles Lambert, testified that coprophilia was a common practice and that religious cannibalism may be psychopathic but "was a matter of taste" and not evidence of a psychosis. The last witness, James Vavasour, repeated Lambert's opinion. Another defense witness was Mary Nicholas, Fish's 17-year-old stepdaughter. She described how Fish taught her and her brothers and sisters several games involving overtones of masochism and child molestation.

None of the jurors doubted that Fish was insane, but ultimately, as one later explained, they felt he should be executed anyway. They found him to be sane and guilty, and the judge sentenced the defendant to death by electrocution. Fish arrived at prison in March 1935, and was executed on January 16, 1936, in the electric chair at Sing Sing. He entered the chamber at 11:06 p.m. and was pronounced dead three minutes later. He was buried in the Sing Sing Prison Cemetery. Fish is said to have helped the executioner position the electrodes on his body. His last words were reportedly, "I don't even know why I'm here." According to one witness present, it took two jolts before Fish died, creating the rumor that the apparatus was short-circuited by the needles that Fish inserted into his body. These rumors were later regarded as untrue, as Fish reportedly died in the same fashion and time frame as others in the electric chair.

At a meeting with reporters after the execution, Fish's lawyer James Dempsey revealed that he was in possession of his client's "final statement". This amounted to several pages of hand-written notes that Fish apparently penned in the hours just prior to his death. When pressed by the assembled journalists to reveal the document's contents, Dempsey refused, stating, "I will never show it to anyone. It was the most filthy string of obscenities that I have ever read."

Victims

Known
 Francis X. McDonnell, age 8, July 15, 1924
 Billy Gaffney, age 4, February 11, 1927
 Grace Budd, age 10, June 3, 1928

Suspected
 Emma Richardson, age 5, October 3, 1926
 Yetta Abramowitz, age 12, 1927
 Robin Jane Liu, age 6, May 2, 1931
 Mary Ellen O'Connor, age 16, February 15, 1932
 Benjamin Collings, age 17, December 15, 1932

In popular culture

A documentary film about Fish was released in 2007, directed by John Borowski. Also in 2007, the biographical film The Gray Man was released, starring Patrick Bauchau as Fish.
Comedian Norm Macdonald used information from Fish's crimes to set up a recurring joke on his podcast, Norm Macdonald Live. The joke included describing horrific elements of the crimes prior to setting up the intentionally anticlimactic punchline, "This guy was a real jerk!"
Several songs about Albert Fish were recorded by American extreme metal band Macabre, featured on their Grim Reality, Gloom, Sinister Slaughter, Behind the Wall of Sleep and Carnival of Killers albums and EPs.

See also

 List of serial killers in the United States
 List of people executed in New York
 Lonely hearts killer

References
Informational notes

Citations

External links

 Albert Fish bibliography

1870 births
1936 deaths
1924 murders in the United States
1927 murders in the United States
1928 murders in the United States
20th-century executions by New York (state)
American cannibals
American male prostitutes
American murderers of children
American people convicted of kidnapping
American people of English descent
American people of Scotch-Irish descent
American rapists
Bisexual men
Child sexual abuse in the United States
Criminals from New York City
Executed American serial killers
Executed people from Washington, D.C.
House painters
LGBT people from New York (state)
Male serial killers
Murder convictions without a body
People convicted of murder by New York (state)
People executed by New York (state) by electric chair
Inmates of Sing Sing
Vampirism (crime)